Ted Dykstra is a Canadian playwright and actor. 

He was born in Chatham-Kent, Ontario in 1961 and grew up in St. Albert, Alberta. 

He is a founding member of Soulpepper Theatre Company. 

Writing credits include Two Pianos Four Hands, Dorian, and Evangeline. 

Acting performances include Bach in Bach's Fight for Freedom and Ed Broadbent in Mulroney: The Opera, as well as some voice work. Dykstra voices Dad Tiger in Daniel Tiger's Neighborhood and Reg in RoboRoach.

In 2003, formed an independent record label Actorboy Records with Gary Sinise.

Formerly married to Melanie Doane with two children, Theo and Rosy.

Coal Mine Theatre
Dykstra and his wife Diana Bentley are co-directors of Coal Mine Theatre.

References

1961 births
Canadian male dramatists and playwrights
Living people
Male actors from Alberta
Male actors from Ontario
People from Chatham-Kent
People from St. Albert, Alberta
Best Supporting Actor in a Television Film or Miniseries Canadian Screen Award winners